Kanimozhi is a 2010 Indian Tamil-language musical romance film directed and written by Sripathi Rangasamy and jointly produced by T. Siva and Sona Heiden. It stars Jai, Shazahn Padamsee, and Vijay Vasanth in the lead roles. The film features music composed by Satish Chakravarthy, cinematography by Chidamparam and editing done by duo Praveen K. L. and N. B. Srikanth.

Kanimozhi was launched in March 2010 and shot in 46 days, being completed in August 2010. Following the release of Enthiran and post-production works, the film was delayed by three months and released on 26 November 2010. It received mixed reviews from critics and became a failure at the box office. However, in 2012 the film was dubbed in Telugu as Love Journey.

Plot 
The film is based on the philosophy that dreams will be fulfilled, presenting Rajesh (Jai) as having a habit of writing his daily life in a diary, while interpreting negative incidents in his life into happy incidents. He comes across a pretty girl named Anu (Shazahn Padamsee), who he is intimidated by and cannot build up the courage to tell her his feelings. Meanwhile, Gowshik (Vijay Vasanth) also takes a liking to Anu and uses a different method to convey his feelings. Whom Anu falls for forms the crux of the story.

Cast 
 Jai as Rajesh
 Shazahn Padamsee as Anu
 Vijay Vasanth as Gowshik
 Michael Thangadurai as Michael
 Lakshmi Ramakrishnan
 Ranga as Hari
 Ashwin Raja as Deepak
 Ajay as Dilip
 Swati Reddy in a guest appearance

Production

Development 
After the success of T. Siva's production, Saroja, the director, Venkat Prabhu, recommended his assistant Sripathy Rangasamy to Siva for a potential collaboration. Venkat Prabhu also recommended Sona Heiden as a joint producer. Sripathy had written the story of Kanimozhi in college and built the screenplay around a story based on philosophy. Siva suggested the title, Kanimozhi, in hope to build anticipation and believed that titling the film after a prominent female politician in M. K. Kanimozhi would help publicity. After approaching her, she stated she had no objection with the title and praised the storyline. Subsequently, posters emerged around Chennai without any credits attached, only featuring the bold lettering of the film's name to create hype.

After working in two films where Sripathy had been an assistant director, Jai was signed to play the leading role of Rajesh. The director suggested that he had wanted an actor who "looked 21" and Jai was "the best bet". Swati Reddy, who featured opposite Jai in the 2008 blockbuster, Subramaniyapuram, was initially considered for the leading female role but was then dropped. Swati later appeared in a guest appearance during the climax. Shazahn Padamsee, who had appeared opposite Ranbir Kapoor in Rocket Singh: Salesman of the Year, subsequently signed on and made her début in Tamil films. Shazahn was approached after Sripathy was sent images of her portfolio by a model-coordinator from Mumbai. She agreed to do the film after consent from her father, noted theatre personality, Alyque Padamsee. Vijay Vasanth was signed on to play a significant role, while Ranga and Michael Thangadurai were selected to play Jai's friends.

Sakthi Saravanan's associate P. Chidamparam was selected to make his début as cinematographer with Kanimozhi. Satish Chakravarthy was signed for the project ten minutes into a meeting with the makers of the film. Notably, T. Siva's maiden production featured music composed by Satish Chakravarthy's father. Venkat Prabhu's editing team of Praveen K. L. and N. B. Srikanth was retained for the project.

Filming 
The film was launched in a ceremony in Chennai on 25 March 2010 organised by the producers. The event was attended by prominent directors including Bala, K. S. Ravikumar and Venkat Prabhu, and several cast members from Jai's previous film, Chennai 600028. Satish Chakravarthy performed songs from the film at the event, while noted actor Nassar compered.

Following the launch, the film started the first schedule in April and completed the shoot within 46 days, shorter than the average Tamil film takes. Furthermore, unlike other most other Indian films, Kanimozhi was shot with live sound, while a special silent camera was also used. The sound was mixed at Yashraj Studios in Mumbai and audiographed by Anandar Chandrahasan. The cast had spoken their lines on the set, with only Shazahn Padamsee's voice being dubbed. The song "Muzhumadhi" was dubbed as the "underwater song" and was completed entirely through the use of graphics, while final mixing for many scenes were record at the Sterling Sound studio, USA. In April 2010, Jai celebrated his 25th birthday while at the filming location in Chennai, with the team throwing a party for him. In June, the work progressed with Shazahn and Jai filming scenes at the AVM Studios in Vadapalani, Chennai. The song recorded at the studio ended the filming portions of the project, which was wrapped up on 18 June 2010.

Despite being a love story, the lead pair had only shot together for two weeks, although they have since stated that they bonded during the filming, helping the on-screen chemistry of the characters. Post production works began in July 2010, preparing for a release in August. However, the film was delayed and works finished in September 2010. A final press meet, two weeks before release, was held on 13 November 2010 with most of the cast in attendance. The producers released the video songs five days before the film released to gain publicity, with Kalaignar TV winning the screening rights; they also acquired the Behindwoods.com homepage for adverts during the time of release.

Release

Reception 
The producers held a premiere for Kanimozhi on 25 November 2010 at Sathyam Cinemas, Chennai for special invitees including Silambarasan, Prasanna and most of Jai's co-stars from his previous films. Shazahn Padamsee, whose Telugu film Orange released on the same day, was unable to make the premiere after suffering from malaria. The film was released throughout Tamil Nadu the following day, having a bigger release in multiplexes across Chennai than Myshkin's Nandhalala, which was released on the same day. Kanimozhi took an average opening at the Chennai box office, beginning in third position and completing 116 shows over the weekend, grossing 14 lakh rupees.

Reviews 
Upon release, the film received mixed reviews from critics, mostly criticising the screen writing from the director. The review from Sify.com labelled the film as "OK" and that for "the intentions alone, the makers of Kanimozhi deserve a thumbs-up".

Jai's role was appreciated and described as "endearingly likeable", while Shazahn Padamsee "looked pretty and was photographed well" but "could have invested more energy and expression to her character". The review goes on to claim that Swati's scene in the climax "scores", and that music by Sathish Chakravarthy "are just about ok but come as speed breakers". The critic cites that "most scenes lack the energy that was required to elevate this film into a different level" and the final result is a "promising but sadly tiresome film" but that it will make you "leave the theatre with a smile on your face".

The review site Top10cinema, branded the film as "average" claiming it "could have been much better". Sripathy is praised, citing that "the debutant filmmaker’s portrayal of characters is appealing" but that "the film fails to offer grippingness at several points". The performances from the actors received a mixed response with Jai dubbed as "too raw and naturalistic" and Shazahn Padamsee being likened to a "Barbie Doll without reaction". However, Vijay Vasanth's acting was described as "appeasing" and Swati's cameo in the climax was praised in the review. It received a similar review from Rediff.com, praising the film's intentions but criticizing the final product.

The Hindu newspaper gave it a more critical review, with a verdict that the film is "a real test of your patience" but revealed it was a "genuine attempt at creating realistic cinema that also entertains", praising the story and the screenplay. The review, however, concludes the script was limited, and the actors' performances were therefore limited.

The review from Behindwoods.com was much less favourable, giving the film 1 star out of 5, citing that is "disappointing" and that it fails to live up to expectations. It cites that for Jai "it is just another film in his career" as per for Vijay Vasanth, while Shazahn Padamsee's performance is particularly criticised with a claim that she "does not seem to know the spelling of emotion in any scene". In regard to technical aspects, it claims that the music by Satish Chakravarthy is "good" but the cinematography "appears bleached throughout". The direction also gains criticism for a "screenplay fails to engage the viewer and is ineffective", describing the film "as a soul-less affair".

Controversy 
In January 2012, it was announced that the film was being dubbed in Telugu by producer Jakkula Nageshwara Rao as Preminchava Nannu. However, this led to Sona Heiden alleging that producer T. Siva had committed acts of fraud and forgery by trying to dub and sell the rights of Kanimozhi to others and thus requested the Tamil Nadu Film Producers' Council to take action. She claimed that she entered into an agreement with T. Siva, proprietor of Amma Creations, on 28 January 2010, for purchasing the entire rights to Kanimozhi and thus secured 50% for any subsequent dubbed versions. Heiden said that Siva had entered into an agreement with third parties for dubbing the film in Telugu, alleging that he forged her signature and sold the rights.

Production work continued and the Telugu version's producer held the logo launch of the film during a Celebrity Cricket League match at the Rajiv Gandhi International Cricket Stadium with actresses Bhavana, Charmy Kaur, Sonia Agarwal, Madhu Shalini and Archana being the chief guests. It was retitled as Love Journey to capitalize on the success of Jai's previous Telugu dubbed film Journey. The audio was released after a function held at another CCL match in Visakhapatnam with CCL director Srinivasa Murthy and Srikanth being prominent guests. The Telugu version geared up for release in March 2012, but the Madras High Court issued a stay order against the release of the film's Telugu version as per Heiden's complaint.

Soundtrack 

The soundtrack to Kanimozhi was composed by Satish Chakravarthy, for whom it became his first theatrical release, as his previous album Leelai was delayed. The soundtrack album features four songs and an additional musical version of another song. The lyrics are penned by Na. Muthukumar and Pa. Vijay while the audio rights were bought by Think Music. The songs were appreciated from critics with a review citing "the music is tidy and uncluttered" and Sathish Chakravarthy's "creativity comes to the fore in a couple of songs", concluding that the "album certainly does not disappoint".

The audio was released in a large function on 22 July 2010 at Kalaignar Arangam, with the Tamil Nadu Chief Minister, M. Karunanidhi and noted actor Vijay being the chief guests and receiving the first copy of the soundtrack. An animated trailer, the first of its kind in Indian cinema, featuring lead actors Jai and Shazahn Padamsee was screened with three songs from the film. Closer to the release in mid October, a theatrical trailer was released.

The Telugu version of the audio was released at a Celebrity Cricket League match in Visakhapatnam. All the songs from the original version were retained with different singers for the Telugu version, while lyrics were written by Vennelakanti and Bhuvanachandra.

References

External links 
 
 Kanimozhi at Jointscene

2010 films
Films shot in Madurai
2010s Tamil-language films
Indian romance films